Rangeway is an inner eastern suburb of Geraldton, Western Australia. Its local government area is the City of Greater Geraldton.

The suburb was gazetted in 1972.

Geography
It is bounded on the west by the North West Coastal Highway and Scott Road, on the north by Eastward Road, and on the east by Blencowe Road and Assen Street.

Demographics

Rangeway residents had a median age of 28, and the median individual income was well below average for the Geraldton region — $328 per week compared with $461 per week. The population of Rangeway was predominantly Australian-born - 76.1% as at the 2006 census - while 3.82% were born in the United Kingdom.

The most popular religious affiliations in descending order in the 2006 census were no religion, Roman Catholic, Anglican, and Uniting. 36.9% of Rangeway residents lived in Department of Housing accommodation.

References

Suburbs of Geraldton